Kawaca is a term for war attire mentioned in Old Javanese texts. Its name comes from the Sanskrit kawaca which means armor, cuirass, a type of chain mail, any kind of cover, corset, jacket.

Description 
Petrus Josephus Zoetmulder, in his Old Javanese-English dictionary, defines kawaca as a chain mail, possibly shaped like a jacket, which is made of metal. The word also has a second meaning, namely the shirt worn by the clergy. Irawan Djoko Nugroho argues that in a military context, kawaca means armor. It is shaped like a long tube and is made of cast copper. According to Jiří Jákl, kawaca was a metal breastplate worn on the upper body of a high-ranking soldier. In high Balinese language, kwaca or kuwaca is a general term for a jacket, although it used to mean armor in Old Javanese.

See also 

 Baju rantai
 Baju lamina
 Baju empurau
 Baru Oroba
 Baru lema'a
 Siping-siping
 Karambalangan

References 

Indonesian inventions
Asian armour
Body armor
Military equipment of antiquity
Military equipment of Indonesia